Madison Opera is a regional opera company based in Madison, Wisconsin.  It was founded in 1961 as an extension of the Madison Symphony Orchestra and came to national prominence in 1993 with the commissioning and premiering of Shining Brow, the opera about Frank Lloyd Wright by composer Daron Hagen and librettist Paul Muldoon.

The general director is Kathryn Smith and the artistic director is John DeMain. The company performs two major operas a year at Madison's Overture Hall, one smaller production in the Overture's Playhouse, and a free summer concert, Opera in the Park. It also offers the Opera Up Close series of preview lectures, which are later made available on the City of Madison's website.

References

External links
Madison Opera website
Opera Up Close

Companies based in Madison, Wisconsin
Musical groups established in 1961
Musical groups from Wisconsin
American opera companies
Performing arts in Wisconsin
1961 establishments in Wisconsin